Ilex brasiliensis, the Brazilian holly, is a species of the genus Ilex in the family Aquifoliaceae.

It is native to Brazil, Paraguay and northern Argentina, and is typically found in Cerrado vegetation.

It is occasionally used as an adulterant in maté.

References

brasiliensis
Endemic flora of Brazil
Flora of the Cerrado
Plants described in 1897